The Basilic, or The Ottoman Cannon was a very large-calibre cannon designed by Orban, a cannon engineer, Saruca Usta and architect Muslihiddin Usta at a time when cannons were still new. It is one of the largest cannons ever built.

The cannon was first offered to Constantine XI, who turned it down due to the cost of its construction. It was later offered to the Ottoman Sultan Mehmed II, who ordered the cannon built after learning that it could smash through walls using a large projectile. When it was completed, the cannon was used by the Ottoman Army during the fall of Constantinople and played a key role in damaging the Walls of Constantinople in 1453. 

Orban managed to build this giant cannon within three months at Adrianople. Due to its size, it was dragged by 60 oxen and 400 men to Constantinople. The cannonball, which could be shot at a distance of one mile, weighed 1,200 pounds. It was horribly powerful, and when it hit, it caused massive damage to Constantinople's walls. The cannon also killed some of its operators.  Additionally, due to the material the cannon was constructed of, and the intense heat created by the charge after each shot, the barrel had to be soaked in warm oil to prevent cold air from penetrating and enlarging the fissures. The heat also prevented the cannon from being fired more than three times per day. Ultimately, it lasted all of six weeks before becoming non-functional.

 Length:      ~24 feet (7.32 m)
 Diameter:    2.5 feet (76.2 cm)
 Cannonball:  1200 lb (540 kg) 
 Range:       ~1 mile  (1.6 km)

References

Large-calibre artillery
Constantinople
Individual cannons
Artillery of the Ottoman Empire